The 2018–19 season was Bengaluru FC's sixth season as club since its establishment in 2013.

Background

Transfers
At the fag end of 2017–18 Indian Super League season Bengaluru FC extended contract of defender Rahul Bheke till May 2021. He joined captain Sunil Chhetri and winger Udanta Singh, both has contract till the end of 2019–20 season. Defender Juanan extended his stay with Bengaluru FC for two more seasons. First choice goalkeeper Gurpreet Singh Sandhu extended his contract for five more seasons, which will keep him till 2023 with Bengaluru FC. Bengaluru FC's Australian midfielder Erik Paartalu also extended his stay with the club for two more seasons. Defender Nishu Kumar and striker Thongkhosiem Haokip extended their stay in the club for two more seasons.

Midfielder Lenny Rodrigues transferred to FC Goa. Midfielder Boithang Haokip extended his stay with Bengaluru FC till the end of 2020 season. Bengaluru FC also extended contract of Spanish midfielder Dimas Delgado for one more season. Defender Harmanjot Khabra extended his stay with Bengaluru FC for three more season. English defender John Johnson ended his five years journey with the club at the end of the season to join 
ATK. Striker Daniel Lalhlimpuia left the Bengaluru FC after three-year stint with the club. Goalkeeper Lalthuammawia Ralte parted ways with the club as well. Bengaluru FC also released Spanish trio of Toni, Víctor Pérez Alonso, and Daniel Lucas Segovia at the end of the season.
Left-back Subhasish Bose transferred to Mumbai City FC. Bengaluru FC also released more inexperienced players at the end of season including Calvin Abhishek, Abhra Mondal, Joyner Lourenco, Zohmingliana Ralte, and Collin Abranches. Midfielder Malsawmzuala left the Bengaluru FC after three-year stint with the club. Midfielder Alwyn George transferred to FC Pune City.

On 3 June 2018, Bengaluru announced signing of Indian winger Kean Lewis for one season. Bengaluru FC also re-signed right-back Rino Anto. On 11 June Bengaluru FC announced signing of defenders Gursimrat Singh Gill and Sairuat Kima for two seasons. On 25 June Bengaluru FC announced signing of Bhutanese forward Chencho Gyeltshen on a one-year deal. On 6 July Bengaluru FC announced signing of Spanish winger Xisco Hernández on a one-year deal. On 9 July, Bengaluru FC announced return of goalkeeper Soram Poirei after three years. He signed a one-year deal. After the early end to their AFC Cup campaign, Bengaluru FC signed Spanish center-back Albert Serrán on a one-year deal.

At the end of winter transfer window, Bengaluru loaned out Bhutanese striker Chencho Gyeltshen on a loan deal to I-League club NEROCA F.C. and was replaced by Spanish Attacking midfielder Luisma. After qualifying for 2018–19 Indian Super League playoffs, Bengaluru signed Spanish midfielder Álex Barrera on a short-term deal, owing to the injury of Erik Paartalu.

In

Out

Out on loan

Pre-season and friendlies
Bengaluru FC started their pre-season on 14 July 2018 at the Bangalore Football Stadium, with a trip to Bellary in the first leg and Spain in the second leg before facing Altyn Asyr of Turkmenistan in AFC Cup Inter-zone play-off semi-finals on 22 August at the Sree Kanteerava Stadium. In the first friendly, Bengaluru played Atlético Saguntino and suffered a close defeat 2–1, with Dimas Delgado scoring the only goal. Playing against UAE Pro-League team Shabab Al-Ahli, Bengaluru suffered another defeat 5–1. Bengaluru's pre-season tour ended winless as they suffered 1–0 and 3–0 defeat to Villarreal B and Barcelona B, respectively.

After the exit in AFC Cup, Bengaluru FC played a friendly against MEG and won 7–0 with Sunil Chhetri and Miku scoring braces. Bengaluru FC played friendlies with I-League side, Chennai City F.C. winning the first 5–0 and losing the second 1–2. Bengaluru FC next played friendly with I-League side, Gokulam Kerala F.C. and won the match 4–1.

Competitions

Indian Super League

Summary

September–October
Bengaluru kicked off their campaign against defending champions Chennaiyin on 30 September 2018. Bengaluru FC started the game in a 4–2–3–1 with new signings Albert Serrán and Xisco Hernández making their ISL debut for the club. Miku broke the deadlock in the 41st minute to earn the lead for the home team. Bengaluru continued to attack in the second half, but none of the team could score the goal and Bengaluru registered the first win of the 2018–19 season. Playing against Jamshedpur FC on 7 October, Nishu Kumar got the lead for Bengaluru at the stroke of half time with a long-range effort. Bengaluru paid for the missed chances as the substitute Gourav Mukhi scored an equalizer in the 81st minute. Bengaluru restored the lead in 87th minute when Sunil Chhetri scored goal from Harmanjot Khabra's lobbed pass. However, Bengaluru failed to secure all 3 points when Sergio Cidoncha scored the equalizer in the last minute and the game ended 2–2. After returning from the international break, Bengaluru played the first away game of the season against FC Pune City on 22 October. Sunil Chhetri scored twice in the first half and Miku scored another goal to wrap up a dominant 3–0 win. Playing the next away game against ATK, Bengaluru were trailing the home team when Komal Thatal scored in 15th minute. Bengaluru equalized just before the half-time when Miku converted the free-kick at the edge of the penalty box. In the second half, Erik Paartalu scored the second goal that proved decisive and Bengaluru won the game.

November–December
Before heading to the international break, Bengaluru FC played southern rivals, Kerala Blasters on 5 November. Sunil Chhetri scored the goal in 17th minute from Miku's pass, but Kerala Blasters equalized in 30th minute when Nishu Kumar was adjudged to have fouled Sahal Samad inside the penalty box and Stojanovič converted the penalty. Both teams continued the quest to find the winner in the second half. Bengaluru FC took the lead in 80th minute when Naveen Kumar could not prevent Nikola Krčmarević's own goal and Bengaluru returned to the top of the table with 2–1 victory. Bengaluru faced FC Goa on 22 November. Miku and Erik Paartalu were ruled out because of injuries and Chencho Gyeltshen made his first start for Bengaluru. The visitors took the lead in the 34th minute as Rahul Bheke's backheel flick off Xisco Hernandez' week shot at goal found the net. Both sides were reduced to 10-men when Mohamed Ali and Dimas Delgado were sent off in the second half. Goa equalized when Coro's square pass found Brandon Fernandes in front of the goal and the forward's shot took a deflection on its way into the net. Just as Goa felt they were back in the match, Sunil Chhetri restored the visitors' lead in the 77th minute from Udanta Singh's cross. Playing against Delhi Dynamos FC on 26 November, Bengaluru played without Miku and Dimas Delgado and Erik Paartalu was not named in the starting lineup after recovering from toe injury. With key players missing, Bengaluru failed to stop Delhi from creating chances and were wasteful in the chances of their own. However, Delhi remained goalless as they could not finish chances they created. The deadlock was broken in the dying minutes when Udanta jumped onto a loose ball and launched a low shot from outside the box. The ball took a deflection before hitting the frame of the goal and crossing the line and Bengaluru regained the top position on the table with 1–0 win.

January–February

March

League stage

Playoffs

Final

Table

Results by matchday

AFC Cup

Inter-zone play-off semi-finals
Bengaluru FC advanced to the inter-zone play-off semi-finals during 2017–18 season. The draw for the Inter-zone play-off semi-finals was held on 23 May 2018. Bengaluru FC were pitted against central Asian zone champions Turkmenistani club Altyn Asyr. Bengaluru played the first leg at home on 22 August 2018. Bengaluru were trailing by 3 goals in the game, but managed to score two goals before the end of the game. Bengaluru further suffered 2–0 defeat in the away leg and bowed out of the AFC Cup with 2–5 aggregate loss.

Super Cup

As one of the top six teams in 2018–19 Indian Super League, Bengaluru FC qualified for the main round in 2019 Indian Super Cup. Bengaluru FC were scheduled to play the I-League side, Mohun Bagan A.C. in Round of 16 match. However, Mohun Bagan withdrew from the tournament and Bengaluru got a walkover and advanced to the quarter-finals and faced 2018–19 I-League champions Chennai City F.C.

Coaching Staff

Management

Albert Roca, after a successful stint of two years, parted ways with Bengaluru FC at the end of the previous season and the assistant coach Carles Cuadrat succeeded him as the head coach.
Updated 14 July 2018

Player statistics

Appearances and goals

|-
! colspan=12 style=background:#dcdcdc; text-align:center| Goalkeepers

|-
! colspan=12 style=background:#dcdcdc; text-align:center| Defenders
|-

|-
! colspan=12 style=background:#dcdcdc; text-align:center| Midfielders
|-

|-
! colspan=12 style=background:#dcdcdc; text-align:center| Forwards
|-

|-
! colspan=12 style=background:#dcdcdc; text-align:center| Players transferred out during the season 
|-

Updated: 4 April 2019

Top scorers

Source: soccerway
Updated: 4 April 2019

Clean sheets

Source: soccerway
Updated: 4 April 2019

Disciplinary record

Source: soccerway
Updated: 4 April 2019

Awards

Player of the Month award

Awarded monthly to the player that was chosen by fan voting

ISL Player of the Month award

Awarded monthly to the player that was chosen by fan voting

See also
 2018–19 in Indian football

Notes

References

Bengaluru FC seasons
2010s in Bangalore
Bengaluru